Nepal has been involving in karate and judo at the Deaflympics since 2013. Nepal has also played in chess at the 2019 Winter Deaflympics.

Medal tallies

Summer Deaflympics

Winter Deaflympics

See also 
 Nepal at the Olympics
 Nepal at the Paralympics

References 

 Nepal at the Deaflympics 

Nations at the Deaflympics